GANDALF was an acronym (Green Anarchist and ALF) for the 1997 trial in the UK of the editors of Green Anarchist magazine, as well as two prominent British supporters of the Animal Liberation Front and Animal Liberation Front Supporters Group (ALF SG), on charges of conspiracy to incite criminal damage.

Beginning in 1995, the Hampshire police under "Operation Washington" began a series of at least 56 raids, which resulted in the August–November 1997 trial in Portsmouth of Green Anarchist editors Steven Booth, Saxon Burchnall-Wood, Noel Molland, and Paul Rogers, as well as the ALF UK press officer Robin Webb and ALF SG newsletter editor Simon Russell. The defendants organized the GANDALF defence campaign. The editors of Green Anarchist—Molland, Burchnall-Wood and Booth—were sentenced to three years in jail for conspiracy to incite criminal damage. After four and a half months, all three were released pending an appeal, and their convictions were later overturned.

Notes

Green anarchism
Animal Liberation Front
1997 in case law
1997 in the United Kingdom